Michael Granger (May 14, 1923 – October 22, 1981) was an American actor. Born Milton Grossman in Kansas City, MO, Granger, he appeared in The Big Heat and in B movies such as Creature With The Atom Brain, as well as on TV shows including Rawhide, Kojak, Gunsmoke and The Untouchables. He created the role of Lazar Wolf, the butcher, in the original Broadway production of Fiddler on the Roof in 1964, and can be heard on the original cast album singing L'Chaim with Zero Mostel.  He appeared in Henrik Ibsen's A Doll's House at the Vivian Beaumont Theater at Lincoln Center with Liv Ullmann in 1975, and was again on Broadway in 1980 in Tennessee Williams's Clothes for a Summer Hotel.  Known for his resonant bass speaking voice, in the final years of Granger's life, he became a sought after voice over actor.  He died October 22, 1981, in New York, NY of heart failure.

Filmography

Les Misérables (1952) - Policeman (uncredited)
Hiawatha (1952) - Ajawac
The Mississippi Gambler (1953) - Poker Player (uncredited)
Salome (1953) - Captain Quintus (uncredited)
The Magnetic Monster (1953) - Kenneth Smith
Fort Vengeance (1953) - Sitting Bull
Tarzan and the She-Devil (1953) - Philippe Lavarre 
White Witch Doctor (1953) - Paal (uncredited)
The Robe (1953) - Slave Dealer (uncredited)
The Big Heat (1953) - Hugo
The Battle of Rogue River (1954) - Chief Mike
Siege at Red River (1954) - Officer at Fort (uncredited)
The Egyptian (1954) - Officer (uncredited)
The Adventures of Hajji Baba (1954) - Musa (uncredited)
Sign of the Pagan (1954) - Hun Scout (uncredited)
Prince of Players (1955) - Protester at Theatre (uncredited)
New Orleans Uncensored (1955) - Jack Petty
Jungle Moon Men (1955) - Nolimo
Cell 2455, Death Row (1955) -  John J. 'Johnny' Albert (uncredited)
Creature with the Atom Brain (1955) - Frank Buchanan
The Conqueror (1956) - Chieftain #1 (uncredited)
Mohawk (1956) - Mohawk Priest
The Harder They Fall (1956) - Gus Dundee's Doctor (uncredited)
Miami Exposé (1956) - Louis Ascot
Rumble on the Docks (1956) - Joe Brindo
Crime of Passion (1957) - Jason, Reporter on Phone (uncredited)
Calypso Heat Wave (1957) - Barney Pearl
Looking for Danger (1957) - Sultan Sidi-Omar
Gunman's Walk (1958) - Curly
Murder by Contract (1958) - Mr. Moon
Official Detective US TV series - John 'Chaz' Smallman (1958)
Pier 5, Havana (1959) - Lt. Garcia
Wake Me When It's Over (1960) - Sergeant (uncredited)
Anatomy of a Psycho (1961) - Lt. Mac

References 

1923 births
20th-century American male actors
American male film actors
American male television actors
1981 deaths